This is a list of parish churches in the Eparchy of Holy Family of London for Ukrainians:

Note: many Ukrainian Catholic local communities share buildings with Latin Rite faithful.

§ indicates a permanently resident Ukrainian Catholic cleric.

England

South
London: Ukrainian Catholic Cathedral of the Holy Family in Exile, Mayfair §
Bedford: St Josaphat Ukrainian Greek Catholic Church, 52 York Street (served from Peterborough)
Bristol: St Mary on the Quay, Colston Avenue (served from Gloucester)
Gloucester: Good Shepherd Ukrainian Catholic Church, Derby Road §

The Midlands
Birmingham: St Catherine of Siena Church, Bristol Street (served from Wolverhampton)
Coventry: St Vladimir the Great, Broad Street §
Derby: St Michael's Ukrainian Catholic Church, Dairyhouse Road
Leicester: Ascension of Our Lord Ukrainian Catholic Church
Nottingham: Our Lady of Perpetual Succour and Saint Alban Ukrainian Catholic Church, Bond Street, Sneinton §
Peterborough: St Olga Ukrainian Catholic Church, New Road, Woodston
Wolverhampton: Saints Volodymyr and Olga Ukrainian Catholic Church, Merridale Street West §

The North
Ashton-under-Lyne: St Paul's Church, Ashton-under-Lyne, Stockton Road (served from Oldham, Greater Manchester)
Rochdale: St Mary and St James Ukrainian Catholic Church, Wardleworth, 328 Yorkshire Street §
Bolton: All Saints Ukrainian Catholic Church, All Saints Street §
Blackburn: Saint Alban's Church, Lingard Terrace (served from Bolton)
Bradford: The Holy Trinity And Our Lady Of Pochayer Ukrainian Catholic Church, Wilmer Road, Bradford § (served by the Basilian Fathers, with resident Sisters Servants of Mary Immaculate)
Dewsbury: Our Lady and Saint Paulinus, Huddersfield Road (served from Bradford)
Manchester: St Mary's Ukrainian Catholic Church, Cheetham Hill Road
Manchester: Our Lady of the Assumption, Bury Old Road, Salford §
Oldham: SS Peter and Paul and All Saints Ukrainian Catholic Church § (Very Revd Bohdan-Benjamin Lysykanych, D Litt, Phd, Syncellus

Wales
Cardiff: Parish of St Theodore of Tarsus at St Cuthbert's, Pomeroy Street
Swansea: Parish of St Theodore of Tarsus at St Peter's, Morriston

Scotland
Leith: St Andrew's Ukrainian Catholic Church, Dalmeny Street

See also
 Ukrainian Greek Catholic Church
 National parish

Notes and references

External links
Contains list of parishes of the Ukrainian Greek Catholic Church in Great Britain

Holy Family
Eastern Catholicism-related lists
Holy Family
Lists of Christian organizations
Lists of organisations based in the United Kingdom
Ukraine religion-related lists